Potassium cyanate is an inorganic compound with the formula KOCN (sometimes denoted KCNO).  It is a colourless solid.  It is used to prepare many other compounds including useful herbicide. Worldwide production of the potassium and sodium salts was 20,000 tons in 2006.

Structure and bonding
The cyanate anion is isoelectronic with carbon dioxide and with the azide anion, being linear.  The C-N distance is 121 pm, about 5 pm longer than for cyanide.  Potassium cyanate is isostructural with potassium azide.

Uses
For most applications, the potassium and sodium salts can be used interchangeably.  Potassium cyanate is often preferred to the sodium salt, which is less soluble in water and less readily available in pure form.

Potassium cyanate is used as a basic raw material for various organic syntheses, including, urea derivatives, semicarbazides, carbamates and isocyanates.  For example, it is used to prepare the drug hydroxyurea. It is also used for the heat treatment of metals (e.g., Ferritic nitrocarburizing).

Therapeutic Uses
Potassium cyanate has been used to reduce the percentage of sickled erythrocytes under certain conditions and has also increased the number of deformalities.  In an aqueous solution, it has prevented irreversibly the in vitro sickling of hemoglobins containing human erythrocytes during deoxygenization.  Veterinarians have also found potassium cyanate useful in that the cyanate salts and isocyanates can treat parasite diseases in both birds and mammals.

Preparation and reactions
KOCN is prepared by heating urea with potassium carbonate at 400 °C:
2 OC(NH2)2  +  K2CO3  →  2 KOCN  +  (NH4)2CO3
The reaction produces a liquid.  Intermediates and impurities include biuret, cyanuric acid, and potassium allophanate (KO2CNHC(O)NH2), as well as unreacted starting urea, but these species are unstable at 400 °C.

Protonation gives a 97:3 mixture (at room temperature) of two tautomers, HNCO (isocyanic acid) and NCOH (cyanic acid).  This mixture is stable at high dilution but trimerizes on concentration to give cyanuric acid.

Properties

Potassium carbonate crystals are destroyed by the melting process so that the urea can react with almost all potassium ions to convert to potassium cyanate at a higher rate than when in the form of a salt.  This makes it easier to reach higher purities above 95%.  It can also be made by oxidizing potassium cyanide at a high temperature in the presence of oxygen or easily reduced oxides, such as lead, tin, or manganese dioxide, and in aqueous solution by reacting with hypochlorites or hydrogen peroxide.  Another way to synthesize it is to allow an alkali metal cyanide to react with oxygen in nickel containers under controlled conditions.  It can be formed by the oxidation of ferrocyanide.  Lastly, it can be made by heating potassium cyanide with lead oxide.

References

External links 
 MSDS
 MSDS at jtbaker.com

Potassium compounds
Cyanates